The 1619 Project is a long-form journalism endeavor developed by Nikole Hannah-Jones, writers from The New York Times, and The New York Times Magazine focused on subjects of slavery and the founding of the United States. The first publication from the project was in The New York Times Magazine of August 2019. The project developed an educational curriculum, supported by the Pulitzer Center, later accompanied by a broadsheet article, live events, and a podcast. Historians, journalists, and commentators have described the 1619 Project as a revisionist historiographical work that takes a critical view of traditionally reverenced events and people in American history, including the Patriots in the American Revolution, the Founding Fathers, along with later figures such as Abraham Lincoln and the Union during the Civil War. On May 4, 2020, the Pulitzer Prize board announced that they were awarding the 2020 Pulitzer Prize for Commentary to project creator Nikole Hannah-Jones for her introductory essay.

The 1619 Project has received criticism from numerous historians, both from the political left and right, who question its historical accuracy. In a letter published in The New York Times in December 2019, historians Gordon S. Wood, James M. McPherson, Sean Wilentz, Victoria E. Bynum, and James Oakes expressed "strong reservations" about the project and requested factual corrections, accusing the project's creators of prioritizing ideology over historical accuracy. The scholars denied the project's claim that slavery was essential to the beginning of the American Revolution. In response, Jake Silverstein, the editor of The New York Times Magazine, defended The 1619 Project and refused to issue corrections.

In March 2020, in light of persistent criticism of the project's portrayal of the role of slavery, The Times issued a "clarification", modifying one of the passages on slavery's role that had sparked controversy.In September 2020, controversy arose over when the Times updated the opening text of the project website to remove the phrase "...understanding 1619 as our true founding..." without accompanying editorial notes. Critics, including Bret Stephens of the Times, claimed the differences showed that the newspaper was backing away from some of the initiative's controversial claims. The Times defended its practices, with Hannah-Jones claiming that most of the project's content had remained unchanged.

In 2020, The New York Times premiered a dedicated podcast series. In 2021, a book anthology of essays and poetry The 1619 Project: A New Origin Story was published, as well as a children's picture book The 1619 Project: Born on the Water by Hannah-Jones and Renée Watson. In January 2023, Hulu premiered a six-part documentary TV series created by Hannah-Jones and The New York Times Magazine.

Background

The 1619 Project was launched in August 2019 to commemorate the 400th anniversary of the arrival of the first enslaved Africans in the British colony of Virginia.  In 1619, a group of "twenty and odd" captive Africans arrived in the Virginia Colony. An English privateer operating under a Dutch letter of marque, White Lion, carried 20–30 Africans who had been captured in joint African-Portuguese raids against the Kingdom of Ndongo in modern-day Angola, making its landing at Point Comfort in the English colony of Virginia.

Although the project places this moment in the context of slavery in the colonial history of the United States, some have taken issue. The first enslaved Africans actually were brought to North America in 1526, and European enslavement of Native Americans has been documented as far back as Columbus in 1493–94. (There is also some evidence for free Africans from Spain among Columbus's crew.)

Project 
The project dedicated an issue of the magazine to a re-examination of the legacy of slavery in America, at the anniversary of the 1619 arrival of the first enslaved people to Virginia. This framing challenges the idea that American history began with the signing of the Declaration of Independence in 1776, which created the United States, or with the arrival of the Pilgrims in 1620.

The project quickly grew into a larger endeavor, encompassing multiple issues of the magazine, with related materials in other Times publications, as well as a school curriculum developed in collaboration with the Pulitzer Center. With support from the Smithsonian, the project recruited a panel of historians to research, develop, and fact-check content. The project was envisioned with the condition that almost all of the content would be from African-American contributors, deeming the perspective of Black writers an essential element of the story to be told.

August 14, 2019, magazine issue

The first edition appeared in a 100-page issue of The New York Times Magazine on August 14, 2019. It included ten written essays, a photo essay, and a collection of poems and fiction, with an introduction by editor-in-chief Jake Silverstein, as follows:
"Our Democracy's Founding Ideals Were False When They Were Written. Black Americans Have Fought to Make Them True", essay by Nikole Hannah-Jones
"American Capitalism Is Brutal. You Can Trace That to the Plantation", essay by Matthew Desmond
"How False Beliefs in Physical Racial Difference Still Live in Medicine Today", essay by Linda Villarosa
"What the Reactionary Politics of 2019 Owe to the Politics of Slavery", essay by Jamelle Bouie
"Why Is Everyone Always Stealing Black Music?", essay by Wesley Morris
"How Segregation Caused Your Traffic Jam", essay by Kevin Kruse
"Why Doesn't America Have Universal Healthcare? One Word: Race", essay by Jeneen Interlandi
"Why American Prisons Owe Their Cruelty to Slavery", essay by Bryan Stevenson
"The Barbaric History of Sugar in America", essay by Khalil Gibran Muhammad
"How America's Vast Racial Wealth Gap Grew: By Plunder", essay by Trymaine Lee
"Their Ancestors Were Enslaved by Law. Now They're Lawyers", photo essay by Djeneba Aduayom, with text from Nikole Hannah-Jones and Wadzanai Mhute
 "A New Literary Timeline of African-American History", a collection of original poems and stories
Clint Smith on the Middle Passage
Yusef Komunyakaa on Crispus Attucks
Eve L. Ewing on Phillis Wheatley
Reginald Dwayne Betts on the Fugitive Slave Act of 1793
Barry Jenkins on Gabriel's Rebellion
Jesmyn Ward on the Act Prohibiting Importation of Slaves
Tyehimba Jess on Black Seminoles
Darryl Pinckney on the Emancipation Proclamation
ZZ Packer on the New Orleans massacre of 1866
Yaa Gyasi on the Tuskegee syphilis experiment
Jacqueline Woodson on Sgt. Isaac Woodard
Joshua Bennett on the Black Panther Party
Lynn Nottage on the birth of hip-hop
Kiese Laymon on the Rev. Jesse Jackson’s “rainbow coalition” speech
Clint Smith on the Superdome after Hurricane Katrina

One of the claims made by Hannah-Jones is that the colonists fought the Revolutionary War to preserve slavery. The claim was later softened to "some of" the colonists fought to preserve slavery. The essays further discuss details of history as well as modern American society, such as traffic jams and the American affinity for sugar, and their connections to slavery and segregation. Matthew Desmond's essay argues that slavery has shaped modern capitalism and workplace norms. Jamelle Bouie's essay draws parallels between pro-slavery politics and the modern right-wing politics. Bouie argues that the United States still has not let go of the assumption that some people inherently deserve more power than others.

Accompanying material and activities

The magazine issue was accompanied by a special section in the Sunday newspaper, in partnership with the Smithsonian, examining the beginnings of the transatlantic slave trade, written by Mary Elliott and Jazmine Hughes. Beginning on August 20, a multi-episode audio series titled "1619" began, published by The Daily, the morning news podcast of the Times. The Sunday sports section had an essay about slavery's impact on professional sports in the United States: "Is Slavery's Legacy in the Power Dynamics of Sports?" The Times plans to take the project to schools, with the 1619 Project Curriculum developed in collaboration with the Pulitzer Center. Hundreds of thousands of extra copies of the magazine issue were printed for distribution to schools, museums and libraries.

The Pulitzer Center on Crisis Reporting has made available free online lesson plans, is collecting further lesson plans from teachers, and helps arrange for speakers to visit classes. The Center considers most of the lessons usable by all grades from elementary school through college.

In November 2021, Random House's One World imprint published the anthology The 1619 Project: A New Origin Story. It is a book-length expansion of the project's essays. The book was created by Nikole Hannah-Jones and The New York Times Magazine, and is edited by Hannah-Jones, Caitlin Roper, Ilena Silverman and Jake Silverstein. Six of the essays from the anthology were adapted into a six-episode miniseries, The 1619 Project, which premiered on January 26, 2023 on Hulu.

Reception

Historical accuracy

In an essay for The New York Review of Books, historian Sean Wilentz accused the project of cynicism for its portrayal of the American Revolution, the Civil War and Abraham Lincoln, who Wilentz wrote is "rendered as a white supremacist."

In a December 2019 letter published in The New York Times, the historians Wood, McPherson, Wilentz, Bynum, and Oakes expressed "strong reservations" about the project and requested factual corrections, accusing the authors of a "displacement of historical understanding by ideology." The letter disputed the claim, made in Hannah-Jones' introductory essay, that "one of the primary reasons the colonists decided to declare their independence from Britain was because they wanted to protect the institution of slavery." The Times published the letter along with a rebuttal from the magazine's editor-in-chief, Jake Silverstein, who defended the accuracy of the 1619 Project and declined to issue corrections. Wood responded in a letter, "I don't know of any colonist who said that they wanted independence in order to preserve their slaves... No colonist expressed alarm that the mother country was out to abolish slavery in 1776." In an article in The Atlantic, Wilentz responded to Silverstein, writing, "No effort to educate the public in order to advance social justice can afford to dispense with a respect for basic facts", and disputing the accuracy of Silverstein's defense of the project.

Also in December 2019, twelve scholars and political scientists specializing in the American Civil War sent a letter to the Times saying that "The 1619 Project offers a historically-limited view of slavery." While agreeing to the importance of examining American slavery, they objected to what they described as the portrayal of slavery as a uniquely American phenomenon, to construing slavery as a capitalist venture, and to presenting out-of-context quotes of a conversation between Abraham Lincoln and "five esteemed free black men." The following month, Times editor Jake Silverstein replied with a rebuttal.

In January 2020, historian Dr. Susan Parker, who specializes in the studies of Colonial United States at Flagler College, noted that slavery existed before any of the Thirteen Colonies. She wrote in an editorial in The St. Augustine Record that "The settlement known as San Miguel de Gualdape lasted for about six weeks from late September 1526 to the middle of November. Historian Paul Hoffman writes that the slaves at San Miguel rebelled and set fire to some homes of the Spaniards." Writing in USA Today, several historians—among them Parker, archaeologist Kathleen A. Deagan also of Flagler, and civil rights activist and historian David Nolan—all agreed that slavery was present decades before the year 1619. According to Deagan, people have "spent their careers trying to correct the erroneous belief" in such a narrative, with Nolan claiming that in ignoring the earlier settlement, the authors were "robbing black history."

In March 2020, historian Leslie M. Harris, who had been consulted for the project, wrote in Politico that she had warned that the idea that the American Revolution was fought to protect slavery was inaccurate, and that the Times made avoidable mistakes, but that the project was "a much-needed corrective to the blindly celebratory histories." Hannah-Jones has also said that she stands by the claim that slavery helped fuel the revolution, though she concedes she might have phrased it too strongly in her essay, in a way that could give readers the impression that the support for slavery was universal. On March 11, 2020, Silverstein authored an "update" in the form of a "clarification" on the Times website, correcting Hannah-Jones's essay to state that "protecting slavery was a primary motivation for some of the colonists." This "clarification" was reportedly prompted by a private warning to Silverstein by Harvard classicist and political scientist Danielle Allen that she might go public with criticism if the passage on the revolution were not corrected.

Response 
In September 2020, lead writer Nikole Hannah-Jones criticized conservatives for their depiction of the project because it "does not argue that 1619 is our true founding." Atlantic writer Conor Friedersdorf responded on Twitter by citing statements from Hannah-Jones that 1619 was the nation's true founding. Critics cited by The Washington Post, such as Quillette magazine, argued that this showed that the Times was quietly revising its position without acknowledgement of the original mischaracterization. The conservative National Association of Scholars published a letter asking for the revocation of the project's Pulitzer Prize.

In an opinion column in the New York Times, Bret Stephens said that Hannah-Jones had said the argument about dating the founding to 1619 was self-evidently metaphorical, but said "these were not minor points. The deleted assertions went to the core of the project's most controversial goal, 'to reframe American history by considering what it would mean to regard 1619 as our nation’s birth year, and argued, "The question of journalistic practices, however, raises deeper doubts about the 1619 Project’s core premises." This column led to tension within the Times, and prompted statements by Times executive editor Dean Baquet, publisher A. G. Sulzberger and New York Times Magazine editor Jake Silverstein in support of the 1619 Project. Responding to criticism, Hannah-Jones wrote on Twitter, "Those who've wanted to act as if tweets/discussions about the project hold more weight than the actual words of the project cannot be taken in good faith", and that "Those who point to edits of digital blurbs but ignore the unchanged text of the actual project cannot be taken in good faith."

Motivations for the American Revolution 
Significant controversy has centered on the project's claim that "one of the primary reasons the colonists decided to declare their independence from Britain was because they wanted to protect the institution of slavery." According to Princeton University professor Sean Wilentz, the claim that there was a "perceptible British threat to American slavery in 1776" is an ahistorical assertion, noting that the British abolitionist movement was practically non-existent in 1776. Wilentz also criticized the project's mentioning the Somerset v Stewart case to support its argument, since that legal decision concerned slavery in England, with no effect in the American colonies. Wilentz wrote that the project's claims that "if the Revolution had caused the ending of the slave trade, this would have upended the economy of the colonies, in both the North and the South" did not consider the numerous attempts to outlaw—or impose prohibitive duties on—the slave trade by several colonies from 1769 to 1774. The historians critical of the project have said that many of America's Founding Fathers, such as John Adams, James Otis, and Thomas Paine, opposed slavery. They also said that every state north of Maryland took steps to abolish slavery after the revolution.

In defense of the project, Silverstein said that the Somerset case caused a "sensation" in American reports. But Wilentz countered that the decision was reported by only six newspapers in the southern colonies, and the tone of the coverage was indifferent. Also at issue was the significance of Dunmore's Proclamation as cited by Silverstein, with Wilentz asserting that the event was a response to rebellion rather than a cause; he also questioned the reliance on a quotation by Edward Rutledge as interpreted by Jill Lepore. Harris has also pointed to Dunmore's Proclamation as a spur to the disruption of slavery by the revolutionary side as well.

Journalistic reaction
The 1619 Project received positive reviews by Alexandria Neason in the Columbia Journalism Review and by Ellen McGirt in Fortune magazine, which declared the project "wide-reaching and collaborative, unflinching, and insightful" and a "dramatic and necessary corrective to the fundamental lie of the American origin story."

Andrew Sullivan critiqued the project as an important perspective that needed to be heard but that was presented in a biased way under the guise of objectivity. Writing in The Washington Post, George Will called the project "malicious" and "historically illiterate." Writing in The Week, Damon Linker found the 1619 Project's treatment of history "sensationalistic, reductionistic, and tendentious." Timothy Sandefur deemed the project's goal as worthy, but observed that the articles persistently went wrong trying to connect everything with slavery. In National Review, Phillip W. Magness wrote that the project provides a distorted economic history borrowed from "bad scholarship" of the New History of Capitalism (NHC), and Rich Lowry wrote that Hannah-Jones' lead essay leaves out unwelcome facts about slavery, smears the Revolution, distorts the Constitution, and misrepresents the founding era and Lincoln. Victor Davis Hanson said that the 1619 Project reveals that The New York Times "does not care about the truth" and instead "hires and promotes its reporters and editors on woke - race and gender - criteria rather than proven reporting excellence."

Political reaction
The project received varied reactions from political figures. Then-Democratic Senator Kamala Harris praised it in a tweet, stating "The #1619Project is a powerful and necessary reckoning of our history. We cannot understand and address the problems of today without speaking truth about how we got here."

High-profile conservatives criticized it. Former House Speaker Newt Gingrich called it "brainwashing" and "propaganda," later writing an opinion piece characterizing it as "left-wing propaganda masquerading as 'the truth. Republican Senator Ted Cruz also equated it with propaganda. President Donald Trump, in an interview on Fox News with Chris Wallace, said, I just look at—I look at school. I watch, I read, look at the stuff. Now they want to change—1492, Columbus discovered America. You know, we grew up, you grew up, we all did, that's what we learned. Now they want to make it the 1619 project. Where did that come from? What does it represent? I don't even know.In July 2020, Republican Senator Tom Cotton of Arkansas proposed the "Saving American History Act of 2020", prohibiting K-12 schools from using federal funds to teach curriculum related to the 1619 Project, and make schools that did ineligible for federal professional-development grants. Cotton added that "The 1619 Project is a racially divisive and revisionist account of history that threatens the integrity of the Union by denying the true principles on which it was founded." On September 6, 2020, Trump responded on Twitter to a claim that the State of California was adding the 1619 Project to the state's public school curriculum. Trump stated that the Department of Education was investigating the matter and, if the aforementioned claim was found true, federal funding would be withheld from California public schools. On September 17, Trump announced the 1776 Commission to develop a "patriotic" curriculum.

In October 2020, the National Association of Scholars, a conservative advocacy group, published an open letter with 21 signatories calling on the Pulitzer Prize Board to rescind Hannah-Jones' prize because of the project's claim that "protecting the institution of slavery was a primary motive for the American Revolution, a claim for which there is simply no evidence."

In November 2020, President Trump established the 1776 Commission by executive order, organizing 18 conservative leaders to generate an opposing response to the 1619 Project. The 1776 Report, released on January 18, 2021, was widely criticized for factual errors, incomplete or missing citations, and lack of academic rigor. The commission was terminated by President Joe Biden on January 20, 2021.

On April 30, 2021, U.S. Senate Minority Leader Mitch McConnell sent a letter to Secretary of Education Miguel Cardona protesting the Department of Education's proposal to modify federal grants to states and local schools to "incentivize them to use tools like the 1619 Project in their classrooms" and demanding that the proposal be abandoned. McConnell's letter charged that the programs were being modified "away from their intended purposes toward a politicized and divisive agenda" and said that "Actual, trained, credentialed historians with diverse political views have debunked the project's many factual and historical errors."

In July 2021, Florida prohibited the teaching of critical race theory in schools, which includes a specific prohibition on use of materials from the 1619 Project.

The World Socialist Web Site criticized what its editors consider the Times reactionary, politically motivated "falsification of history" that wrongly centers on racial rather than class conflict.

Awards
Project creator Nikole Hannah-Jones was awarded the 2020 Pulitzer Prize for Commentary for her essay. The award cited her "sweeping, provocative and personal essay for the ground-breaking 1619 Project, which seeks to place the enslavement of Africans at the center of America's story, prompting public conversation about the nation's founding and evolution."

In October 2020, New York University's Arthur L. Carter Journalism Institute named the 1619 Project one of the ten greatest works of journalism in the 2010–2019 decade.

See also
 Four Hundred Souls: A Community History of African America, 1619–2019 (2021)
 500 Years Later (2005)
 Jamestown 2007
 1776 Unites
 Critical race theory
 Voyages: The Trans-Atlantic Slave Trade Database
 Historical revisionism
 1836 Project

References

Further reading 
 Gordon-Reed, Annette; Stremlau, Rose; Lowery, Malinda; Reed, Julie L.; Barker, Joanne; Sharfstein, Daniel; Scott, Daryl Michael; Wulf, Karin; Greene, Sandra E.; Sweet, James H.; Troutt Powell, Eve M.; Schine, Rachel; Mikhail, Alan; Edwards, Erika Denise; Williams, Danielle Terrazas (2022). "The 1619 Project Forum". The American Historical Review. 127 (4): 1792–1873.

External links 

 Print edition (2019 August). The New York Times Magazine.
 Podcast series (2019 August–October).
 "The 1619 Project Sparks Dialogue and Reflection in Schools Nationwide." Pulitzer Center (2019 December 20).
 "Pulitzer Center on Crisis Reporting: 2019 Annual Report." Pulitzer Center (2020).

1619 in the Thirteen Colonies
2019 essays
2019 poems
2019 short stories
2019 introductions
Magazine articles
Historical revisionism
The New York Times
Slavery in the British Empire
Historiography of the United States
African-American-related controversies
Virginia historical anniversaries
Race-related controversies in literature
1619 establishments in the Thirteen Colonies
1619 establishments in Virginia